Lisa Keim is an American politician serving as a member of the Maine Senate from the 18th district. She was first elected to office in 2016. Following her re-election in 2022, Keim was chosen to be the Senate assistant minority leader.

Background 
Keim earned a Bachelor of Science degree in leadership and marketing from the University of Southern Maine. She was elected to the Maine Senate in 2016. During her tenure, Keim has served as chair of the Senate Judiciary Committee and a member of the Senate State and Local Government Committee. As chair of the Judiciary Committee, Keim managed a working group to study Maine's legal aid system. She has also served as co-chair of the national Future of Work Task Force for the Council of State Governments.

References 

Year of birth missing (living people)
Living people
Republican Party Maine state senators
Women state legislators in Maine
University of Southern Maine alumni
21st-century American politicians
21st-century American women politicians